The Minister for Workplace Relations and Safety is a minister in the government of New Zealand. The minister has responsibility for WorkSafe New Zealand and acts as chair of the Industrial Relations Foundation. It was preceded by the Minister of Labour.

The minister oversees the health and safety at work regulatory system, employment relations and standards regulatory system including the overarching employment relations framework and prescribed minimum standards, such as the minimum wage and holiday entitlements.

List of ministers
Key

References

Workplace Relations and Safety
Public office-holders in New Zealand
Workplace Relations and Safety